Exxen  is a Turkish subscription streaming service and production company. Owned by Acun Medya, Turkish TV production and rights acquisition company, Exxen was launched on 1 January 2021. Exxen produces its own content, as well as owning various streaming rights of foreign productions and sports events.

History

Exxen was established and commercially registered in Turkey, in 2017. The platform was first announced by Turkish media mogul Acun Ilıcalı through his Instagram account on 24 September 2020. The name of the platform was suggested by Ali Taran, Turkish marketing executive who held previously partnerships with Ilıcalı in various shows. In initial phase, the company hired around 1,500 employees to run its operations. Subsequently, it was revealed that the annual budget of the platform will be 900 million TRY. Launched in 1 January 2021, the number of user of the platform hit 500,000 users in three days after the launch, according to a statement from Ilıcalı via his social media account.

In June 2021, Exxen announced that they purchased the streaming rights of UEFA Champions League and UEFA Europa League for three consecutive seasons, starting from 2020–21.

References

External links
Official website
Exxen at YouTube

Turkish companies established in 2017
Turkish brands